The Leech Cup is an cup named after Major Arthur Blennerhassett Leech, and awarded to long range shooters by the National Rifle Association of America. It is the oldest trophy awarded in competitive target shooting in the United States. Firing is with rifles equipped with metallic, non-magnifying sights.

History
The cup was presented to the Amateur Rifle Club of New York by Maj. Arthur Leech. He was the Captain of the Irish Rifle Team and in 1874 he had the cup made to celebrate his team coming to America. The US team won the 1874 match by 3 points. The event was shot with the US team using American-made rifles and the Irish team using rifles from Irish maker John Rigby.

It was presented to the National Rifle Association in 1901 by the Amateur Rifle Club of New York. The Cup was lost in 1913 and was not recovered until 1927. The trophy is awarded each year in the NRA National High Power Championships.

The 1903 Cup was awarded to Corporal Charles Blish Winder of the Ohio National Guard.

See also
 List of sport awards
Prizes named after people

References

 
Shooting sports in the United States
American sports trophies and awards
Awards established in 1875